Iftekharul Alam Kislu (1927/28 - 5 January 2019) was a Bangladeshi film producer and businessperson. He was the president of the Federation of Bangladesh Chambers of Commerce & Industries.

Biography
Kislu was Ahmed Sharif's uncle. He was the owner of Star Film Corporation. He produced Sangam (1964), Anwara (1967), Ora Egaro Jon (1972) and Dui Poisar Alta (1982).

Besides his career in Dhallywood Kislu was a businessperson. He was the president of the Federation of Bangladesh Chambers of Commerce & Industries in 1980. He was a lifetime member of North South University Trust.

Kislu died on 5 January 2019 at the age of 91.

Selected filmography
 Sangam (1964)
 Behula (1966)
 Alibaba (1967)
 Anwara (1967)
 Songsar (1968)
 Ora Egaro Jon (1972)
 Dui Poisar Alta (1982)

References

1920s births
2019 deaths
Bangladeshi businesspeople
Bangladeshi film producers